The Art of Loss is the sixth studio album of Californian progressive metal band Redemption. This is the first album without guitarist and founding member Bernie Versailles, who is presently on an indefinite medical leave of absence from the band because he suffered an aneurysm in October 2014. To replace Versailles in the recordings, the guitarist and DGM member Simone Mularoni and former Megadeth guitar players Chris Poland, Chris Broderick and Marty Friedman were invited. Vocalist John Bush from Armored Saint also was guest to sing Love, Reign o'er Me, a cover of The Who in duet with Ray Alder.

The album was released on February 26, 2016 via Metal Blade Records and can be streamed in its entirety in the SoundCloud and Bandcamp pages of the band. A video was made for the title track, which features a guest appearance by guitarist Chris Poland. The video was directed by Brian Cox of Flarelight Films.

Critical reception
Sputnik Music writer Trey Spencer came away impressed stating, "The Art of Loss maintains the heavy riffs and driving rhythms of This Mortal Coil, but returns the focus to the classy progressive metal that defined the band’s earlier albums. If The Art of Loss isn’t considered Redemption’s best album, it’s damn near close."

Track listing

Personnel

Band members
 Ray Alder - vocals
 Nick van Dyk - guitars, keyboards
 Sean Andrews - bass
 Chris Quirarte - drums

Guest musicians
 Chris Poland - guitars (1, 2, 4, 6, 7, 8, 9)
 Simone Mularoni - guitars (1, 2, 7, 9)
 Marty Friedman - guitars (3, 6)
 Chris Broderick - guitars (6)
 John Bush - vocals (8)
 Parker van Dyk - backing vocals (9)

References

External links
Official Redemption website
Redemption's Official Bandcamp
Redemption On Metal Blade Records

2016 albums
Metal Blade Records albums
Redemption (band) albums